The Complete Terry and The Pirates is a collection of the American comic strip, Terry and the Pirates. The strip was authored by Milton Caniff and originally appeared in newspapers between 1934 and 1946 by the Chicago Tribune Syndicate with over 31 million readers. The collection comprises six hardcover volumes and was published by The Library of American Comics between 2007 and 2009. The series' first volume won the 2008 Eisner Award in the category Best Archival Collection - Project - Comic strips.

Format  
The volumes measure 11 × 8.5 inches, (278 mm × 216 mm). The Sunday pages are reproduced in full color alongside the daily strips in black-and-white. The material was sourced from Dean Mullaney's private collection with supplemental pages from Cartoon Research Library at Ohio State University. Three black-and-white daily strips appear on each page. Each Sunday strip appears on a separate page. Introductions were written by Pete Hamill, Howard Chaykin and Bruce Canwell, putting the strip and its plotlines in historical context. Background on the strip's characters, an overview of the cast, as well as an index are included. Each book has about 360 pages and comes with a dust jacket.

Since The Complete Terry and the Pirates would be The Library of American Comics' publishing debut, there were pre-launch questions about if the project would be completed as a whole or cancelled before completion. Dean Mullaney, the publisher and editor of the series had however already taken this risk in account, therefore all six volumes of the series were produced all in one go and in advance to the series' debut, so that LOAC later would be able to publish the whole series whatever response it would receive from buyers when the volumes were consecutively released.

Volumes

{| class="wikitable sortable"
|+ style="background-color:#B0C4DE" | Volumes
|-
! style="background-color:#D0E4FE" data-sort-type="number" | Volume 
! style="background-color:#D0E4FE" | Release date
! style="background-color:#D0E4FE" | Title
! style="background-color:#D0E4FE" | Period
| style="background-color:#D0E4FE" | Page count
! style="background-color:#D0E4FE" | ISBN
|-
|1||2007-09-04||“The Complete Terry and the Pirates - Vol. 1”||1934–1936||368||
|-
|2||2008-02-05||“The Complete Terry and the Pirates - Vol. 2”||1937–1938||352||
|-
|3||2008-05-06||“The Complete Terry and the Pirates - Vol. 3”||1939–1940||352||
|-
|4||2008-10-07||“The Complete Terry and the Pirates - Vol. 4”||1941–1942||352||
|-
|5||2008-12-16||“The Complete Terry and the Pirates - Vol. 5”||1943–1944||352||
|-
|6||2009-03-03||“The Complete Terry and the Pirates - Vol. 6”||1945–1946||352||
|}

References

External links 

 Publisher website - IDW Publishing - The Library of American Comics - The Complete Terry And The Pirates
 The Library of American Comics' YouTube channel - Inside look: Terry and the Pirates - Vol. 1
 The Library of American Comics' YouTube channel - Inside look: Terry and the Pirates - Vol. 2
 The Library of American Comics' YouTube channel - Inside look: Terry and the Pirates - Vol. 3
 The Library of American Comics' YouTube channel - Inside look: Terry and the Pirates - Vol. 5
 The Library of American Comics' YouTube channel - Inside look: Terry and the Pirates - Vol. 6

Comic strip collection books
Eisner Award winners
The Library of American Comics publications
Terry and the Pirates